Daniel Robert Harrison (born 4 November 1982) is an English footballer who plays for Flint Town United.

Career
Born Liverpool and formerly a resident of Upton, Harrison is a product of the Tranmere Rovers youth system. Joining the club as a 13-year-old, he was granted his first team debut in the 2001–02 season at home against Wigan Athletic. Harrison was a regular in the centre of midfield in the Brian Little era, but under Ronnie Moore he found opportunities harder to come by prompting a move to a new squad. He signed for Rotherham on 25 May 2007 along with Dale Tonge. He scored his first goal for the club against Sheffield Wednesday in the League Cup. He then bragged a brace against Dagenham & Redbridge. His next goal came away at Milton Keynes Dons, where he scored an equaliser with a 25-yard screamer 10 minutes from time.

He was released by Rotherham in May 2012.

On 7 June 2012, it was announced that he had rejoined Tranmere Rovers on a one-year contract from 1 July 2012. The following summer he dropped into the Conference National when he joined neighbours Chester.

He then moved into playing within the Welsh football pyramid, joining Connah's Quay Nomads in 2015.  He left the club in August 2021 having made over 189 starts for the Nomads, with his service to the club at the time ranking him as seventh on the club all-time starts list. He then joined Flint Town United.

References

External links

1982 births
Living people
Footballers from Liverpool
English footballers
Association football midfielders
Tranmere Rovers F.C. players
Rotherham United F.C. players
Chester F.C. players
Connah's Quay Nomads F.C. players
English Football League players
Cymru Premier players
Flint Town United F.C. players